The Story Prize is an annual book award established in 2004 that honors the author of an outstanding collection of short fiction with a $20,000 cash award. Each of two runners-up receives $5,000. Eligible books must be written in English and first published in the United States during a calendar year. The founder of the prize is Julie Lindsey, and the director is Larry Dark. He was previously series editor for the annual short story anthology Prize Stories: The O. Henry Awards from 1997 to 2002.

Publishers, authors, or agents may enter a short story collection written in English by a living author and published in the U.S. during a calendar year. Three finalists are announced in January. These authors participate in an award event at the New School in New York City (co-sponsored with the Creative Writing Dept.) in early March at which they read from their work and have an on-stage discussion with Dark. At the end of the event, Julie Lindsey announces the winner, who, in addition to the prize money, receives an engraved silver bowl.

In March 2019, Catapult published The Story Prize: 15 Years of Great Short Fiction, an anthology celebrating the award's fifteenth anniversary.

Recipients

The Story Prize Spotlight Award

This $1,000 award is given to a short story collection of exceptional merit, as selected by the Director of the Story Prize, from among all entrants. Winners of The Story Prize Spotlight Award might be promising works by first-time authors, collections in alternative formats, or works that demonstrate an unusual perspective on the writers’ craft.

 2012: Krys Lee, Drifting House
 2013: Ben Stroud, Byzantium
 2014: Kyle Minor, Praying Drunk
 2015: Adrian Tomine, Killing and Dying
 2016: Randa Jarrar, Him, Me, Muhammad Ali
 2017: Lee Conell, Subcortical
 2018: Akil Kumarasamy, Half Gods
 2019: Ayşe Papatya Bucak, The Trojan War Museum
 2020: Asako Serizawa, Inheritors
 2021: Adam Thompson, Born Into This
 2022: Arinze Ifeakandu, God's Children Are Little Broken Things

References

External links
The Story Prize web site
TSP: The Official Blog of The Story Prize
Webcast of 2008 event
Webcast of 2009 event
Webcast of 2010 event
Webcast of 2011 event
Webcast of 2012 event
Webcast of 2013 event
Webcast of 2014 event
Webcast of 2015 event
Webcast of 2016 event
Webcast of 2017 event
Webcast of 2018 event
Webcast of 2019 event
Webcast of 2020 event
2021 video

American literary awards
Short story awards
Awards established in 2004
English-language literary awards